Khwaja Shams-ud-Din (1922 – 19 April 1999) was the Prime Minister of Jammu and Kashmir for a brief period of time from 12 October 1963 to 29 February 1964. He was first elected to the Legislative Assembly in 1956 and re-elected in 1962, 1967 and 1972.  It was during his administration, on 26 December 1963, that the Prophet's Relic was stolen from the Hazratbal Shrine. Weeks after that incident, he was replaced by Ghulam Mohammed Sadiq.

References

1922 births
1999 deaths
Kashmiri people
Chief Ministers of Jammu and Kashmir
Jammu & Kashmir National Conference politicians
Chief ministers from Jammu & Kashmir National Conference